Beaconsfield is an artist-run gallery situated in Vauxhall, south London, England. It occupies a Victorian building consisting of the southern wing of the former original Lambeth ragged school.

History
The gallery was founded in 1994 by Naomi Siderfin, David Crawforth and Angus Neill. Siderfin and Crawforth continue to direct and curate the gallery, working collaboratively with commissioned artists. Prior to establishing Beaconsfield, Siderfin and Crawforth started Nosepaint, an organization that presented interdisciplinary art events involving artists, writers, film makers and musicians between 1991 and 1994.

Location
Beaconsfield occupies a Victorian building consisting of the southern wing of the former original Lambeth Ragged School, established between 1849 and 1851 by Henry Beaufoy. The building housed one of approximately 200 Ragged Schools in the area, named after the appearance of the poverty-ridden children in attendance. Network Rail and its predecessors have owned the site since 1903, when most of the school was taken down for the expansion of the railway.

Gallery
The gallery programme involves the exhibition of interdisciplinary visual art and hosts artist residencies commissioned by the directors that are open to the public. It was awarded funding from Arts Council England between 2012 and 2015.

Restaurant
Beaconsfield offers its venue for hire to fashion shows, photo shoots, launches and wedding receptions over three floors. On the lower level is the Ragged Canteen, a daytime vegetarian café.

References

External links
 
 
 

1994 establishments in England
Art galleries established in 1994
Contemporary art galleries in London
Buildings and structures in the London Borough of Lambeth
Vauxhall